The 1932 Wisconsin Badgers football team was an American football team that represented the University of Wisconsin in the 1932 Big Ten Conference football season. The team compiled a 6–1–1 record (4–1–1 against conference opponents), finished in third place in the Big Ten Conference, outscored all opponents by a combined total of 151 to 48, and was ranked No. 11 at the end of the season under the Dickinson System. Clarence Spears was in his first year as Wisconsin's head coach.

Guard Greg Kabat was selected by the Associated Press (AP) and United Press (UP) as a first-team player on the 1932 All-Big Ten Conference football team. Kabat was also the team captain.

In the annual rivalry game with Minnesota, halfback Walter "Mickey" McGuire scored all three touchdowns, including an 85-yard return of the opening kickoff and the game-winning touchdown reception with seconds remaining, as the Badgers defeated the Gophers, 20–13. McGuire was selected as the team's most valuable player, and he was also selected by the AP and UP as a second-team All-Big Ten halfback.

The team played its home games at Camp Randall Stadium. The capacity was reduced from 38,293 to 32,700 for the 1932 season. During the 1932 season, the average attendance at home games was 16,344.

Schedule

References

Wisconsin
Wisconsin Badgers football seasons
Wisconsin Badgers football